It's Heavy in Here is the first solo studio album by the American singer-songwriter Eric Matthews. It was released by Sub Pop Records on September 26, 1995. A track from the album, "Fanfare", was released as a single in the UK only, charting at No.112.

Track listing

Personnel
Phil Baldino – clarinets on "Angels for Crime"
Robin Baldino – violin on "Soul Nation Select Them", "Three-Cornered Moon" and "Poisons Will Pass Me"
Karen Bryan – violin on "Soul Nation Select Them", "Three-Cornered Moon" and "Poisons Will Pass Me"
Kim Burton – viola on "Three-Cornered Moon" and "Poisons Will Pass Me"
Dennis Conti – tenor saxophone on "Three-Cornered Moon"
Curtis Daily – string bass on "Three-Cornered Moon" and "Poisons Will Pass Me"
Jason Falkner – electric guitar on "Fanfare", "Forging Plastic Pain", "Hop and Tickle", "Distant Mother Reality" and "Flight and Lion"; bass on "Fanfare", "Soul Nation Select Them", "Hop and Tickle", "Distant Mother Reality", "Flight and Lion" and "Sincere Sensation"; drums on "Soul Nation Select Them" and "Lust Takes Time"; acoustic guitar on "Distant Mother Reality"; piano on "Flight and Lion"
Steve Hanford – drums on "Fanfare", "Angels for Crime", "Hop and Tickle", "Flight and Lion" and "Sincere Sensation"
Wendy Karden – flutes on "Soul Nation Select Them"
Tony Lash – drums on "Forging Plastic Pain"; tambourine on "Sincere Sensation"
Eric Matthews – all vocals; electric guitar on "Fanfare", "Lust Takes Time" and "Distant Mother Reality"; acoustic guitar on "Soul Nation Select Them", "Angels for Crime", "Hop and Tickle", "Flight and Lion", "Sincere Sensation" and "Fanfare (reprise); piano on "Soul Nation Select Them" and "Fried Out Broken Girl"; trumpets on "Fanfare", "Fried Out Broken Girl" and "Three-Cornered Moon"; harpsichord on "Faith to Clay" and "Three-Cornered Moon"; bass on "Angels for Crime" and "Lust Takes Time"; organ on "Three-Cornered Moon" and "Poisons Will Pass Me"; tenor recorder on "Distant Mother Reality"; Hammond B-3 organ on "Sincere Sensation"; percussion on "Sincere Sensation"
Wes Matthews – acoustic guitar on "Faith to Clay"
Lori Presthus – cello on "Soul Nation Select Them", "Three-Cornered Moon" and "Poisons Will Pass Me"
Karen Strand – oboe on "Soul Nation Select Them"

References

External links
Wilonsky, Robert, "Who gives a Hootie? Farewell to 1995, a year in music we'd rather forget", Dallas Observer, December 28, 1995
Athitakis, Mark, "The Lateness of the Hour", Salon.com, September 4, 1997
Perry, Douglas, "Eric Matthews wants you (but only if it's the right way)", "The Oregonian", January 16, 2008 (includes photograph of Eric Matthews)

1995 debut albums
Eric Matthews (musician) albums
Sub Pop albums
Orchestral pop albums
Baroque pop albums